Lorenzo di Piero de' Medici (12 September 1492 – 4 May 1519) was the ruler of Florence from 1516 until his death in 1519. He was also Duke of Urbino during the same period. His daughter Catherine de' Medici became Queen Consort of France, while his illegitimate son, Alessandro de' Medici, became the first Duke of Florence.

Early life
Lorenzo was born in Florence on 12 September 1492, a son of Piero di Lorenzo de' Medici and Alfonsina Orsini. His paternal grandparents were Lorenzo the Magnificent and Clarice Orsini. His maternal grandparents were Roberto Orsini, Count of Tagliacozzo and his wife, Catherine of San Severino.

Career
Lorenzo II became lord of Florence in August 1513, after his uncle, Giuliano de' Medici, handed over control of its government. Ambitious by nature, Lorenzo II, despite being appointed Captain of the Florentine militia, lacked patience with Florence's republican system of government and thus, in 1516, convinced his uncle, Pope Leo X to make him Duke of Urbino at the age of 24. So began a conflict with the city's previous duke, Francesco Maria I della Rovere. During the protracted War of Urbino, Delle Rovere recaptured the city, only to have Medici — commanding a 10,000-man Papal army — in turn, retake the city. During battle, Lorenzo was wounded, which prompted him to retire to Tuscany. In September 1517, he regained Urbino via treaty; however, it remained under the Medici family's rule for only two years. In 1521 the duchy reverted to the Della Rovere family.

On 13 June 1518, Lorenzo married Madeleine de la Tour, daughter of the Count of Auvergne. The marriage produced a daughter, Catherine, in 1519. Catherine de' Medici went on to become Queen of France, via a marriage to the future King Henry II of France, arranged by the second Medici Pope, Pope Clement VII.

Only 21 days after Catherine de' Medici's birth, Lorenzo II died, "worn out by disease and excess." Thus his daughter Catherine was raised primarily by the Medici Popes, Leo X and Clement VII, and their surrogates.

Lorenzo II's tomb is in the Medici Chapel of Florence's Church of San Lorenzo. There is disagreement over which of the two tombs is Lorenzo II's. The received view is that Lorenzo'ss tomb that is adorned by Michelangelo's sculpture Pensieroso, which offers an idealized portrait of Lorenzo II, and that its companion piece, also sculpted by Michelangelo, represents Lorenzo II's uncle Giuliano di Lorenzo de' Medici. But historian Richard Trexler has argued that Lorenzo II, having been Captain of the Florentine militia, must be the figure holding the baton, symbol of military authority conferred by the Republic. Trexler also notes that the "Pensieroso" is holding a mappa, the symbol of military authority in ancient Rome, which would be an appropriate symbol for Giuliano di Lorenzo, who was appointed Captain of Roman forces. In sharing the same name with his illustrious ancestor, Lorenzo the Magnificent, the Duke's tomb is often mistaken for that of his grandfather.

Famously, Niccolò Machiavelli dedicated his political treatise The Prince to Lorenzo to advise him of tactics to use to maintain his authority.

Ancestry

See also
 House of Medici
 Medici Chapel

Notes

Sources

Rothfield, Lawrence (2021). The Measure of Man: Liberty, Virtue, and Beauty in the Florentine Renaissance. Rowman & Littlefield.

External links

The Medici (The Senior or 'Cafaggiolo') Family Line – The Glorious 1400s

Lorenzo 2
1492 births
1519 deaths
Deaths from syphilis
Lorenzo 2
16th-century people of the Republic of Florence
Captains General of the Church
Dukes of Urbino
Burials at San Lorenzo, Florence
16th-century Italian nobility
16th-century monarchs in Europe